Dobranje is a village in Cista Provo municipality, Croatia.

Dobranje is located to the north of Imotska Krajina. The village is 570 meters above sea level.

History
The oldest document which mentions Dobranje is located in the archive of the Oriental Institute in Sarajevo and dates from 1585. Dobranje was probably populated before the Turkish invasion in the 15th century. When the Turks came the local population fled to various places. Later they returned and some newcomers also arrived. Since Dobranje was on the border of Ottoman Empire and  the Venetian Republic there were many immigrants to the village. Major migrations happened when Turks expatriated Catholics from Herzegovina, especially in the time of the Morean War between Turks and Venetians (1684–1699) and the Austro-Turkish War (1716–1718).

References

Populated places in Split-Dalmatia County